Andrei Tcaciuc (born 10 February 1982) is a Moldavian football midfielder who plays for FC Speranța Crihana Veche.

Club statistics
Total matches played in Moldavian First League: 117 matches - 12 goals

References

External links

Profile at Divizia Nationala

1982 births
People from Bender, Moldova
Moldovan footballers
FC Daugava players
Moldovan expatriate footballers
Expatriate footballers in Latvia
Moldovan expatriate sportspeople in Latvia
Living people
Association football midfielders